Reedsburg is an unincorporated community in Wayne County, in the U.S. state of Ohio.

History
Reedsburg was laid out in 1835 by William Reed, and named for him. A post office called Reedsburg was established in 1893, and remained in operation until 1907.

References

Unincorporated communities in Wayne County, Ohio
Unincorporated communities in Ohio